Bank Hapoalim ( lit. The Workers' Bank) is one of the largest banks in Israel, established in 1921. The bank offers a broad range of financial services to retail, corporate, and institutional customers, with a focus on retail banking services. It operates a network of more than 250 branches and offices in Israel and abroad. Bank Hapoalim is a prominent player in the Israeli banking sector, with a significant market share.

History
The bank was established in 1921 by the Histadrut,  the Israeli trade union congress  (lit. "General Federation of Laborers in the Land of Israel") and the Zionist Organisation.

The bank was owned by the Histadrut until 1983, when it was nationalized following the Bank Stock Crisis. The bank was held by the Israeli government until 1996 when it was sold to a group of investors led by Ted Arison.

The bank has  a significant presence in global financial markets. In Israel, it has over 600 ATMs (automated teller machines), 250 bank branches, 7 regional business centers, 22 business branches and industry desks for major corporate customers. The bank's stock is traded on the Tel Aviv Stock Exchange.

At the end of 2015,  the bank had 11,930 employees worldwide. It is controlled by Arison Holdings,  owned by Shari Arison. Arison Holdings owns a total of 15.74 per cent of the bank. 
 
In January 2014, Danske Bank and the Dutch pension fund PGGM blacklisted Bank Hapoalim for its involvement in the financing of settlements in the Palestinian territories.

In 2021, the bank reported a net profit of 915 million shekels ($267 million) in Q4 2020, compared to a net loss of 629 million shekels in Q4 2019. The bank's credit portfolio grew, and it entered the digital wallet sector and made deals with banks in Bahrain and the UAE.

In 2023, the bank reported a record net profit of NIS 6.5bn ($1.82bn) for 2022, up 33% from the previous year, boosted by a rise in interest rates and higher inflation.

Global presence
The bank operates several international subsidiaries: In the City of London and Poalim Asset Management (UK) Limited; in the United States (New York City, California, & Miami) and in Canada; BHI Private Banking, Switzerland Bank Hapoalim (Switzerland) Ltd., Zurich, Geneva, Luxembourg, South America, and the Cayman Islands.

2018-2022 Plan
Bank Hapoalim reached an agreement that cancels the  labor dispute called by the Histadrut labour federation in December. The Jan 2020 deal, according to the regulatory filing by the bank in Tel Aviv, suggests to raise worker wages by an average of 3.7%  from 2018 to 2022, bank employees will also get a one-time grant of 210 million shekels ($60.6 million), whereas the bank also place to reduce its workforce by over 900 jobs through an early retirement plan.

Controversies and criticism

Tax evasion and money laundering
On 30 April 2020, the Bank was found to be complicit in tax evasion and money laundering relating to FIFA and bidding for the World Cup. It was ordered to pay fine of $874.3 million after pleading guilty to the first charge, which involved helping US taxpayers to stash some $7.6 billion in more than 5,500 secret Swiss and Israeli bank accounts. It was the second-largest recovery by the US Department of Justice since it began investigating the facilitation of US tax evasion by foreign banks in 2008.

It was ordered to pay $30 million in forfeitures and fines in relation to the second charge, which pertained to helping launder more than $20 million in bribes and kickbacks for officials involved in the corruption scandal that embroiled football's world governing body FIFA in 2015. Internal Revenue Service criminal investigation chief, Don Fort, said "There is no excuse for a foreign financial institution to unlawfully assist wealthy Americans in flouting their responsibilities to pay their taxes. With today's guilty plea, Bank Hapoalim is taking responsibility for their role in deliberately breaking the law and undermining the integrity of this nation’s tax system."

Assistant attorney general Brian Benczkowski stated that "for nearly five years, Bank Hapoalim employees used the US financial system to launder tens of millions of dollars in bribe payments to corrupt soccer officials in multiple countries", while William Sweeney, assistant director of the FBI's New York field office, said that "Bank Hapoalim admits executives looked the other way, and allowed illicit activity to continue even when employees discovered the scheme and reported it."

Involvement in Israeli settlements

On 12 February 2020, the United Nations published a database of 112 companies helping to further Israeli settlement activity in the West Bank, including East Jerusalem, as well as in the occupied Golan Heights. These settlements are considered illegal under international law. Bank Hapoalim was listed on the database on account of its "provision of services and utilities supporting the maintenance and existence of settlements" and "banking and financial operations helping to develop, expand or maintain settlements and their activities" in these occupied territories.

On 5 July 2021, Norway's largest pension fund KLP said it would divest from Bank Hapoalim together with 15 other business entities implicated in the UN report for their links to Israeli settlements in the occupied West Bank.

Bank logos

See also

Economy of Israel

References

External links

 International website
 Israeli website 

Hapoalim
Companies based in Tel Aviv
Companies listed on the Tel Aviv Stock Exchange
Formerly government-owned companies of Israel
Israeli brands
Banks established in 1921